Nu'mon Xakimov (born 5 September 1978) is a Tajikistani footballer who is a forward for Vakhsh Qurghonteppa. He is a member of the Tajikistan national football team and scored most of their goals (4 out of 7) in the 2010 FIFA World Cup qualification campaign.

Career statistics

International

Statistics accurate as of match played 2 September 2011

International goals
Scores and results list Tajikistan's goal tally first.

Note: 
On 16 April 2006, in the 2006 AFC Challenge Cup Final between Tajikistan and Sri Lanka, the match summary indicates that teammate Dzhomikhon Mukhidinov scored a hat-trick. However, in match review article also published by the Asian Football Confederation on 19 April 2006, it indicates that Mukhidinov only scored two goals while Hakimov scored one goal.

Honours

Club
Vakhsh Qurghonteppa
Tajik League (1): 2009, 2011
Tajik Cup (1): 2003
Parvoz Bobojon Ghafurov
Tajik Cup (1): 2007
Ravshan Kulob
Tajik League (2): 2012, 2013

International
Tajikistan
AFC Challenge Cup (1): 2006

Personal
Tajikistan Footballer of the Year: 2009

References

External links

1978 births
Living people
Tajikistani footballers
Tajikistan international footballers
Vakhsh Qurghonteppa players
Association football forwards
Tajikistan Higher League players